The 2018 A Lyga was the 29th season of the A Lyga, the top-tier association football league of Lithuania. The season began on 25 February 2018 and ended on 11 November 2018.

Sūduva Marijampolė began the season as defending champions having won their first league title last year. They secured a second consecutive title in ARVI Football Arena on 7 November, after they beaten Atlantas 6–0.

Teams

Clubs and locations

The following teams are competing in the 2018 championship:

 Stadium location

Personnel and kits
Note: Flags indicate national team as has been defined under FIFA eligibility rules. Players and Managers may hold more than one non-FIFA nationality.

Managerial changes

Regular season

Table

Results

First half of season

Second half of season

Championship round

Table

Results

Relegation play-offs
The 7th placed team faced the runners-up of the 2018 LFF I Lyga for a two-legged play-off. The winner on aggregate score after both matches earned entry into the 2019 A Lyga.

First leg

Second leg

Palanga won 5–0 on aggregate and therefore both clubs remain in their respective leagues.

Positions by round
The table lists the positions of teams after each week of matches. In order to preserve chronological progress, any postponed matches are not included in the round at which they were originally scheduled, but added to the full round they were played immediately afterwards. For example, if a match is scheduled for matchday 13, but then postponed and played between days 16 and 17, it will be added to the standings for day 16.

Updated to games played on 11 November 2018

Season statistics

Top scorers

Updated to games played on 11 November 2018

Top assists

Updated to games played on 11 November 2018

Clean sheets

Updated to games played on 11 November 2018

Hat-tricks

Discipline

Player 
 Most yellow cards: 9
  Slavko Blagojević (Žalgiris)
 Most red cards: 2
  Linas Klimavičius (Žalgiris)

Club 
 Most yellow cards: 68
 Kauno Žalgiris
 Most red cards: 5
 Žalgiris

Attendance

Awards

Yearly awards

Individual
Awards were presented at the Lithuanian Football Awards ceremony, which was held on 21 February 2019. Finalists for voted awards were announced after the season and winners were presented at the award ceremony.

Team of the Year

Monthly awards

Individual

Team of the Month

Notes

References

External links
 

LFF Lyga seasons
2018 in Lithuanian football
Lithuania
Lithuania